Geno DeNobile (March 6, 1933 – May 5, 1995) was a Grey Cup champion Canadian football player, playing from 1956 to 1964 with the Hamilton Tiger-Cats.

Born in Hamilton, he came up through the ranks with the Hamilton Tiger-Cats Junior B team. He was an unsung hero of the great Tiger-Cat teams. Though he was never an all-star during his 9-year career, he played in seven Grey Cup games, winning two of them in 1957 and 1963.

He died on May 5, 1995.

References 

1933 births
1995 deaths
Canadian football guards
Hamilton Tiger-Cats players
Players of Canadian football from Ontario
Sportspeople from Hamilton, Ontario